Horaglanis populi is a species of airbreathing catfish endemic to India, mainly in wells and underground water channels around Pathanamthitta District, Kerala. It lacks pigmentation and eyes, like other cavefish, Like other species of similar catfishes found in Kerala, it is also obtained from laterite wells.

References 

populi
Catfish of Asia
Cave fish
Freshwater fish of India
Fish described in 2023